SS Anselm was a British turbine steamship of the Booth Steamship Company. She was built as a cargo and passenger liner in 1935 and requisitioned and converted into a troop ship in 1940. A German submarine sank her in 1941, killing 254 of those aboard.

Building and civilian service
The Booth Steamship Company ordered Anselm for its passenger and cargo liner services between Liverpool and Brazil. William Denny and Brothers built her in its shipyard at Dumbarton on the Firth of Clyde in Scotland.

By the 1930s most British shipping companies specified oil fuel for new steamships because it was more economical. Booth, however, still specified coal because it was cheaper, and as the company's ships carried little cargo on outward voyages to South America and it considered it could afford larger coal bunkers. Anselms bunkers had capacity for 980 long tons of coal.

Anselm had nine corrugated furnaces with a combined grate area of  heating three single-ended Howden-Johnson water-tube boilers with a combined heating surface of  that supplied steam at 250 lbf/in2.

Booth proposed a multiple-expansion steam reciprocating engine, with steam exhausted from the low-pressure cylinder then driving a low-pressure steam turbine for greater efficiency, as installed on its recent ships ,  (1931),  (1934) and Crispin (1935). However, Denny persuaded Booth that it would be more economical to use pure turbine propulsion. Sources disagree as to whether she had three separate turbines or one three-stage Parsons turbine. Either way, her power was rated at 696 NHP and drove the shaft of her single propeller via single-reduction gearing.

Anselm was the last new ship ever built for Booth Line.

War service
In November 1939 Anselm was in Liverpool and was due to sail to Pará via for Lisbon. Because of war conditions she was to leave with Convoy OB 32, which would then join Convoy OB 6. However, her sailing was cancelled and OB 32 left without her. Instead Anselm was requisitioned and quickly converted to carry about 500 troops. Her civilian passenger accommodation was assigned for officers; her holds were converted to accommodation for other ranks.

On 13 January 1940 she sailed from Freetown, Sierra Leone in Convoy SLF 16, which joined Convoy SL 16 and reached Liverpool on 27 January. On 25 June 1940 she left Freetown in Convoy SL 37, which reached Liverpool on 12 July. On 21 July 1940 she left Liverpool carrying 82 child evacuees to Halifax, Nova Scotia for the Children's Overseas Reception Board. In October 1940 she left Freetown in either Convoy SL 52 or Convoy SLF 52; the two combined at sea and on 10 November reached Liverpool.

On 18 December 1940 Anselm left Britain with Military Convoy WS 5A bound for Suez. On Christmas Day 1940 the  attacked Anselm, but Royal Navy escort cruisers drove Hipper off and the convoy dispersed. The convoy reformed on 27 December 1940 at Freetown and reached Suez on 16 February 1941. On her return voyage Anselm joined Convoy SL 74, which left Freetown on 10 May and reached Liverpool on 4 June. On 30 June Anselm left Liverpool again bound for Suez, sailing with Convoy WS 9B, which dispersed on 18 July.

Final voyage and loss

Toward the end of June 1941 Anselm left Britain for Freetown again. She was heavily overloaded with about 1,200 British Army, Royal Marines and Royal Air Force personnel: more than twice the 500 she had been converted to carry. There were 175 RAF personnel, posted to serve in the North African Campaign.

Some accounts say she sailed from Gourock on the Firth of Clyde; another that she left Loch Ewe in northwest Scotland on 26 June; another that she left Liverpool in England on 28 June. Some suggest that her escort also included the armed merchant cruiser .

Challenger was leading the troop ship in line ahead; Starwort was stationed in line astern because her ASDIC was out of order. Lavender and Petunia were in screening positions ahead, either side of Challengers bow. At about 0350 hours the fog cleared, and the convoy began to zigzag as evasive action against possible attack.

However, a Luftwaffe Focke-Wulf Fw 200 Condor patrol had reported the convoy's position and at 0426 hours the German Type VIIC submarine , commanded by Kptlt Heinrich Lehmann-Willenbrock, fired a spread of four torpedoes at Challenger and Anselm. None hit Challenger but one struck Anselms port side amidships, causing extensive damage and momentarily lifting the troop ship in the water. U-96 dived and the corvettes counter-attacked, Lavender firing six depth charges and Petunia firing 20. When the attack drew too close to the survivors it was broken off, but the submarine was seriously damaged and broke off her patrol to return to Saint-Nazaire submarine base in occupied France for repairs.

Anselm launched all her lifeboats except no. 6, which had been damaged by the explosion. Challenger had been  ahead but manoeuvred close to Anselms port quarter and took off 60 or more survivors as the troop ship's bow settled in the water.

Officers from the passenger accommodation were able to reach the boat deck, but the impact caused extensive damage below decks, where collapsed overheads and wrecked ladders injured or trapped many of the men in one of the converted holds. One survivor states that officers got away in boats from Anselms stern without waiting to help their men.

Cecil Pugh, GC

One officer who stayed aboard to the end was an Air Force chaplain lately of RAF Bridgnorth, Squadron Leader Cecil Pugh, who
"seemed to be everywhere at once, doing his best to comfort the injured, helping with the boats and rafts... and visiting the different lower sections where men were quartered. When he learned that a number of injured airmen were trapped in the damaged hold, he insisted on being lowered into it with a rope. Everyone demurred because the hold was below the water line and already the decks were awash and to go down was to go to certain death. He simply explained that he must be where his men were."

The ship sank 22 minutes after being hit, and four crew and about 250 troops were killed. Pugh went down with the ship, and in 1947 was posthumously awarded the George Cross.

Survivors

Most men aboard, including the majority of other ranks, did survive. Anselms Master, Andrew Elliot, 92 of her crew, three DEMS gunners and 965 troops were rescued. Many were at first in the water, but were picked up by Challenger, Starwort or the ship's own lifeboats and rafts.

One leading aircraftman, Wilfrid Marten, recalled being in the sea for a few hours and being "near death's door" before he was rescued by a lifeboat. An officer in the boat then ordered him to row, but was silenced by a Naval rating or petty officer who threatened to throw the officer over the side.

Most of the survivors in the boats and rafts were transferred to the escort ships, ascending the sides by scramble nets. This left Challenger and the corvettes badly overloaded, so the survivors were transferred again to HMS Cathay which landed them at Freetown. The escorts may have missed one lifeboat, as one survivor reports that after the sinking he spent 18 days in a boat with neither food nor water.

See also
List of ships built by William Denny and Brothers

References

Sources

 

1935 ships
Cargo liners
Maritime incidents in July 1941
Merchant ships of the United Kingdom
Passenger ships of the United Kingdom
Ships of the Booth Steamship Company
Ships built on the River Clyde
Ships sunk by German submarines in World War II
Steamships of the United Kingdom
World War II merchant ships of the United Kingdom
World War II shipwrecks in the Atlantic Ocean